The 2022 Chinese Football Association Division Two League season was the 33rd season since its establishment in 1989. This season, the team participating with 18 teams is the last season as 18 teams however the team expansion to 20 teams from 2023.

Format

Groups

Centralised venues
Qiannan (Groups A and F)
Duyun International Football Town Field No.7
Duyun International Football Town Field No.12
Qiannan Nationwide Fitness Centre Stadium
Yancheng (Groups B and D)
Dafeng Olympic Sports Centre
Yancheng Yufeng Football Training Base Field No.1
Yancheng Yufeng Football Training Base Field No.2
Yancheng Yufeng Football Training Base Field No.3
Dalian (Groups C and E)
Dalian Youth Football Training Base Field No.9
Dalian Youth Football Training Base Field No.10
Puwan Stadium Outer Field

Clubs

Club changes

To League Two
Teams promoted from 2021 Chinese Champions League
 Jinan Xingzhou
 Jiangsu Zhongnan Codion
 Tai'an Huawei
 Lingshui Dingli Jingcheng
 Hubei Huachuang
 Zibo Qisheng
 Shaoxing Shangyu Pterosaur
 Zhuhai Qin'ao

From League Two
Teams promoted to 2022 China League One
 Qingdao Hainiu
 Hebei Kungfu
 Guangxi Pingguo Haliao
 Qingdao Youth Island
 Shanghai Jiading Huilong

Dissolved entries
 Sichuan Minzu
 Xiamen Egret Island
 Shanxi Longjin
 Hebei Zhuoao
 Xi'an Wolves
 Kunming Zheng He Shipman

Name changes
 Tai'an Huawei F.C. changed their name to Tai'an Tiankuang in February 2022.
 Jiangsu Zhongnan Codion F.C. changed their name to Nantong Haimen Codion in March 2022.
 Lingshui Dingli Jingcheng F.C. changed their name to Hainan Star in March 2022.
 Hubei Huachuang F.C. changed their name to Wuhan Jiangcheng in March 2022.
 Yichun Grand Tiger F.C. changed their name to Jiangxi Dark Horse Junior in April 2022.

Clubs information

Clubs Locations

Managerial changes

First stage

Group A

League table

Results

Positions by round

Results by match played

Group B

League table

Results

Chinese Football Association awarded Dandong Tengyue, Wuhan Jiangcheng and Wuxi Wugou each a 3–0 win against Hunan Billows after Hunan Billows failed to name enough players to compete. These matches were not played.

Positions by round

Chinese Football Association awarded Dandong Tengyue, Wuhan Jiangcheng and Wuxi Wugou each a 3–0 win against Hunan Billows after Hunan Billows failed to name enough players to compete. These matches were not played and they were originally scheduled to be played in rounds 8, 9 and 10 respectively.

Results by match played

Chinese Football Association awarded Dandong Tengyue, Wuhan Jiangcheng and Wuxi Wugou each a 3–0 win against Hunan Billows after Hunan Billows failed to name enough players to compete. These matches were not played and they were originally scheduled to be played in rounds 8, 9 and 10 respectively.

Group C

League table

Results

Positions by round

Results by match played

Promotion stage

Group D

League table

Results

Positions by round

Results by match played

Relegation stage

Group E

League table

Results

Positions by round

Results by match played

Group F

League table

Results

Chinese Football Association awarded Zhuhai Qin'ao and Quanzhou Yassin each a 3–0 win against Inner Mongolia Caoshangfei after Inner Mongolia Caoshangfei failed to arrive in the centralised venues due to COVID-19 travel restrictions. These matches were not played.

Positions by round

Chinese Football Association awarded Zhuhai Qin'ao and Quanzhou Yassin each a 3–0 win against Inner Mongolia Caoshangfei after Inner Mongolia Caoshangfei failed to arrive in the centralised venues due to COVID-19 travel restrictions. These matches were not played and they were originally scheduled to be played in round 1 and 2 respectively.

Results by match played

Chinese Football Association awarded Zhuhai Qin'ao and Quanzhou Yassin each a 3–0 win against Inner Mongolia Caoshangfei after Inner Mongolia Caoshangfei failed to arrive in the centralised venues due to COVID-19 travel restrictions. These matches were not played and they were originally scheduled to be played in round 1 and 2 respectively.

Goalscorers

Hat-tricks

References

External links

3
China League Two seasons